Chrissy Wallace (born May 15, 1988) is an American stock car racing driver. She is the daughter of NASCAR driver Mike Wallace, niece of Rusty Wallace and Kenny Wallace, cousin of Steve Wallace, and sister of Matt Wallace.

Racing career
At 19 in 2007, Wallace became the first female driver to ever win at Hickory Motor Speedway in North Carolina. 

She made her NASCAR Craftsman Truck Series debut in March 2008 at Martinsville Speedway, finishing 18th in the No. 03 Toyota for Germain Racing. She raced in six races that season. In 2009, Wallace finished a career-best 13th in the Mountain Dew 250 at Talladega Superspeedway in the No. 08 Chevrolet for SS-Green Light Racing.

In 2010, she made her NASCAR Nationwide Series debut in the DRIVE4COPD 300 at Daytona. Driving the No. 41 Chevrolet, she started 35th and finished 43rd after crashing on the first lap. Wallace also made the Aaron's 312 at Talladega, finishing 24th in the No. 0 for JD Motorsports.

In 2011, Wallace became the first woman to win an American Speed Association Late Model track championship at Lebanon I-44 Speedway, the same track where her father Mike won the championship in 1990.

Motorsports career results

NASCAR
(key) (Bold – Pole position awarded by qualifying time. Italics – Pole position earned by points standings or practice time. * – Most laps led.)

Nationwide Series

Camping World Truck Series

ARCA Racing Series
(key) (Bold – Pole position awarded by qualifying time. Italics – Pole position earned by points standings or practice time. * – Most laps led.)

References

External links
 
 

Living people
1988 births
Sportspeople from St. Louis
Racing drivers from St. Louis
Racing drivers from Missouri
NASCAR drivers
American female racing drivers
Wallace family